All Souls' Eve is a 1921 American silent drama film directed by Chester M. Franklin and starring Mary Miles Minter.  The film is based on the mystical 1920 Broadway play of the same name by Anne Crawford Flexner, with a story by Elmer Blaney Harris. Much was made of the film's use of double, triple and quadruple exposures to enable Minter to play two parts within the same scenes. As with many of Minter's features, it is thought to be a lost film.

Plot

As described in various film magazine reviews, Nora O'Hallahan (Minter) is a young girl living in Ireland, who firmly believes that, on All Souls' Eve, the spirits of the dead return to visit those whom they loved in life. Her mother is living in America, and Nora sails to join her. When she arrives, she finds that her mother has died, and she takes up a position as a nursemaid with the Heath family. Roger Heath is a sculptor, and he and his wife Alice (also Minter) have one young son, Peter (Moore).

Olivia Larkin (Phillips) is in love with Roger, and desperately jealous of Alice Heath. When she finds that she is unable to lure Roger away from his wife, she convinces Lawson, a madman living in the local woods, that Alice Heath is the one responsible for his misfortunes. Lawson murders Alice, and Roger, devastated by his wife's death, neglects his work and his son, turning to drink and Olivia for solace.

On All Souls' Eve, young Peter Heath falls seriously ill. Nora, who has been caring for him, tries to rouse Roger, but he is too drunk to respond. She sends for Dr. McAllister (Geldart), but before he can arrive, the soul of Alice Heath descends from heaven and, unable to save her son herself, transfers her love for him into Nora, who saves Peter's life.

After this event, Roger finds that Nora becomes ever more like Alice in appearance and mannerisms. He asks her to pose for him so that he can complete his masterpiece of sculpture - a statue of Alice - and shuns Olivia and drink as he comes to realise that he loves Nora. Olivia is pursued to her death in a lake by the madman Lawson, and Nora becomes Roger's wife and mother to little Peter.

The February 12th, 1921 edition of Motion Picture News lists a musical cue sheet for the film.

Cast
 Mary Miles Minter as Alice Heath / Nora O'Hallahan
 Jack Holt as Roger Heath
 Carmen Phillips as Olivia Larkin
 Clarence Geldart as Dr. Sandy McAllister
 Michael D. Moore as Peter Heath (credited as Mickey Moore)
 Fanny Midgley as Mrs. O'Hallahan
 Lottie Williams as Belle Emerson
 Alice Knowland (uncredited)
 Lucien Littlefield (uncredited)

References

External links

 

1921 films
1921 drama films
Silent American drama films
American silent feature films
American black-and-white films
Films about reincarnation
American films based on plays
Lost American films
Lost drama films
1921 lost films
Films based on works by American writers
1920s American films
Silent horror films